The Creeper is an album by American trumpeter Donald Byrd. Along with Byrd, the album Sonny Red, Pepper Adams, Chick Corea, Miroslav Vitous, and Mickey Roker. It was recorded in October 1967 but not released on the Blue Note label until 1981.

Reception
The Allmusic review by Scott Yanow awarded the album 2½ stars and stated "For the last time, Byrd was heard in prime form in an acoustic format... although none of the originals caught on as standards (or have been performed since), together as a whole they give one a lot of variety in the then-modern hard bop field. Pity that this album has been out of print since the mid-'80s".

Track listing
All compositions by Donald Byrd except as indicated

 "Samba Yantra" (Chick Corea) - 9:35
 "I Will Wait for You" (Norman Gimbel, Jacques Demy, Michel Legrand) - 9:05
 "Blues Medium Rare" - 6:06
 "The Creeper" (Sonny Red) - 4:38
 "Chico-San" (Corea) - 6:45
 "Early Sunday Morning" - 6:18
 "Blues Well Done" - 6:21

Personnel
Donald Byrd - trumpet
Sonny Red - alto saxophone (tracks 1, 3-7)
Pepper Adams - baritone saxophone (tracks 1, 3-7)
Chick Corea - piano
Miroslav Vitouš - bass
Mickey Roker - drums

References

1981 albums
Albums recorded at Van Gelder Studio
Blue Note Records albums
Donald Byrd albums
Albums produced by Alfred Lion
Albums produced by Duke Pearson
Albums produced by Francis Wolff